The field armies (軍) of the National Revolutionary Army were military formations of the National Revolutionary Army during the Chinese Republic. It usually exercised command over two NRA Corps and often a number of Independent Divisions and Independent Brigades and some supporting units. The Chinese Republic had 30 Armies during the Second Sino-Japanese War. The use of the Army was gradually reduced, but not eliminated, in favor of the Army Group after the 1938 reforms.

List 
 19th Route Army
 Eighth Route Army
 Fourth Army
 New 1st Army
 New 6th Army
 New Fourth Army

References 

 Hsu Long-hsuen and Chang Ming-kai, History of The Sino-Japanese War (1937-1945) 2nd Ed., 1971. Translated by Wen Ha-hsiung, Chung Wu Publishing; 33, 140th Lane, Tung-hwa Street, Taipei, Taiwan Republic of China.

Armies of the National Revolutionary Army
Chinese military-related lists